Kedma may refer to:

 Kedma (film), a film directed by Amos Gitai
 Kedma, Israel, a village in south-central Israel
 KEDMA, an Orthodox Jewish student group
 Kedma School, an alternative secondary school in Jerusalem

he:קדמה (פירושונים)